CIME-FM is a French-language Canadian radio station located in Saint-Jérôme, Quebec, about  north of Montreal.

Owned and operated by Cogeco, it broadcasts on 103.9 MHz using a directional antenna with an average effective radiated power of 11,700 watts and a peak effective radiated power of 39,300 watts (class C1).

The station has an adult top 40 format under the CIME branding.

The station also operates two rebroadcasters : a low-power one (CIME-FM-1) in Val-Morin, on 102.9 using a directional antenna with an average effective radiated power of 4 watts and a peak effective radiated power of 14 watts (class LP), and a stronger one (CIME-FM-2) in Mont-Tremblant, on 101.3 with an effective radiated power of 800 watts (class B) using an omnidirectional antenna.

CIME-FM opened on March 25, 1977, and originally had a middle of the road format, which gradually evolved over time to a more traditional hot adult contemporary format and currently it is an adult contemporary station.

CIME-FM was originally located in Sainte-Adèle, about 70 kilometres north of Montreal, and had a 50,000 watts omnidirectional signal on 99.5 MHz. The station moved to Saint-Jérôme in mid-1998, at the same time that it moved to 103.9 and inaugurated its 101.3 relay (the smaller 102.9 one was operational since the beginning). These changes in frequencies were a result of a deal to allow the 99.5 to be used in Montreal for the new CJPX-FM. As a result, CIME-FM can only be heard now in parts of Montreal itself, but has a better coverage in their targeted area (the Laurentides region).

The station is especially famous or infamous (depending on the point of view) for its now-discontinued practices of airing subliminal messages intended to induce relaxation at night  and using a system of audio tones as a mosquito repellent.

On December 17, 2010, the CRTC approved the sale of most of Corus Entertainment's radio stations in Quebec, including CIME-FM, to Cogeco. The sale closed February 1, 2011, and by August 2011, the station adopted the tri-oval Rythme FM logo on CIME-FM; however the CIME branding and hot adult contemporary stayed because of the adult contemporary format already heard on nearby flagship and sister station CFGL-FM Laval. As a result, programming is different, save for majority of nighttime programming, which largely simulcasts CFGL-FM.

On August 22, 2016, the station left the Rythme network and adopted a new slogan: "La Couleur Musicale des Laurentides".

References

External links
CIME (official website)
Decision CRTC 86-435
Decision CRTC 97-292
 

Ime
Ime
Ime
Ime
Saint-Jérôme
Radio stations established in 1977
1977 establishments in Quebec